The Dallas Baptist Patriots baseball team represents Dallas Baptist University, which is located in Dallas, Texas. The Patriots are an NCAA Division I college baseball program that competes in Conference USA. They began competing in Division I in 2004 and joined the Missouri Valley Conference in 2014 after only one season with the Western Athletic Conference. They are the only Dallas Baptist program in Division I and the Missouri Valley Conference. All other Dallas Baptist programs compete in Division II's Lone Star Conference. DBU is also the only D-II member that competes in D-I baseball.

The Dallas Baptist Patriots play all home games on campus at Joan and Andy Horner Ballpark. Under the direction of Head Coach Dan Heefner, the Patriots have played in nine NCAA Tournaments and hosted their first regional in 2015. Over their six seasons in the Missouri Valley Conference, they have won three MVC regular season titles and four MVC tournaments.

Since the program's inception in 1970, 18 Patriots have gone on to play in Major League Baseball, highlighted by 3-time All-Stars Freddy Sanchez and Ben Zobrist. Under current head coach Dan Heefner, 52 Patriots have been drafted, including Vic Black who was selected in the first round of the 2009 Major League Baseball Draft.

Conference membership history (Division I only) 
 2004–2012: Independent
 2013: Western Athletic Conference
 2014–2022: Missouri Valley Conference
 2023–present: Conference USA

Joan and Andy Horner Ballpark 

Joan and Andy Horner Ballpark is a baseball stadium on the Dallas Baptist campus in Dallas that seats 3,492 people. It was opened on February 15, 2013 with a 9–11 loss to Creighton. A record attendance of 3,242 was set on May 31, 2015 during an NCAA Tournament game against Texas.

Head coaches (Division I only) 
Records taken from the 2020 DBU baseball media guide.

Year-by-year NCAA Division I results
Records taken from the 2020 DBU baseball media guide.

NCAA Division I Tournament history
The NCAA Division I baseball tournament started in 1947.
The format of the tournament has changed through the years.
Dallas Baptist began playing Division I baseball in 2004.

Awards and honors (Division I only)

 Over their 16 seasons in Division I, 16 Patriots have been named to an NCAA-recognized All-America team.
 Over their 6 seasons in the Missouri Valley Conference, 24 different Patriots have been named to the all-conference first-team.

All-Americans

Freshman First-Team All-Americans

Missouri Valley Conference Player of the Year

Missouri Valley Conference Defensive Player of the Year

Missouri Valley Conference Pitcher of the Year

Missouri Valley Conference Coach of the Year

Missouri Valley Conference Newcomer of the Year

Missouri Valley Conference Freshman of the Year

Taken from the 2020 DBU baseball media guide. Updated February 25, 2020.

Patriots in the Major Leagues

Taken from the 2020 DBU baseball media guide. and the 2021 DBU baseball media guide  Updated June 9, 2021.

See also
List of NCAA Division I baseball programs

References